"Still Falling in Love" is a single by the Canadian country music artist Carroll Baker. Released in 1980, it was the first single from her album All for the Love of a Song. The song reached number one on the RPM Country Tracks chart in Canada in December 1980.

Charts

References

1980 singles
Carroll Baker songs
1980 songs
RCA Records singles